Trenton may refer to:

Places

Canada
Trenton, Nova Scotia, a town
Trenton, Ontario, an unincorporated community
CFB Trenton, a Canadian Forces Base near Trenton, Ontario

United States
Trenton, New Jersey, the capital of the state of New Jersey
Trenton, Alabama, an unincorporated community
Trenton, Florida, a city
Trenton, Georgia, a city
Trenton, Illinois, a city
Trenton, Indiana, an unincorporated community
Trenton, Iowa, a census-designated place
Trenton, Kansas, an unincorporated community
Trenton, Kentucky, a city
Trenton, Maine, a town
Trenton, Michigan, a small city
Trenton, Missouri, a city
Trenton, Nebraska, a village
Trenton, New York, a town
Trenton, North Carolina, a town
Trenton, North Dakota, an unincorporated community
Trenton, Ohio, a city
Trenton, South Carolina, a town
Trenton, Tennessee, a city
Trenton, Texas, a city
Trenton, Utah, a town
Trenton, Wisconsin (disambiguation), various places
Trenton Township (disambiguation), various places

People
Trenton (given name)
Daniel Trenton (born 1977), Australian taekwondo athlete
Jim Trenton (born 1953), American radio broadcaster

Other uses
Roman Catholic Diocese of Trenton, New Jersey
Trenton Airport (disambiguation)
Trenton station (disambiguation)
Trenton High School (disambiguation)
Trenton (Cumberland, Virginia), a historic plantation home located near Cumberland, Virginia
, the name of four United States Navy ships
Battle of Trenton, American Revolutionary War battle in New Jersey, December 26, 1776
Second Battle of Trenton, January 2, 1777
Trenton (pilot boat), formerly the fishing schooner Kernwood

See also

Trenton Historic District (disambiguation)
Trenton Line, a train line that goes from Trenton, New Jersey to Philadelphia
Trenton Six, six African-American defendants tried for murder of an elderly white shopkeeper in 1948